The Minims, officially known as the Order of Minims (abbreviated OM), and known in German-speaking countries as the Paulaner Order, are a Roman Catholic religious order of friars founded by Francis of Paola in fifteenth-century Italy. The order soon spread to France, Germany and Spain, and continues to exist today.

Like the other mendicant orders, there are three separate components, or orders, of the movement: the friars, contemplative nuns and a Third Order of laypeople who live in the spirit of the order in their daily lives. At present there are only two fraternities of the Minim tertiaries; both are in Italy.

History

The founder of the order, Francis of Paola, was born in 1416 and named in honor of Francis of Assisi. The boy became ill when he was only one month old, and his mother prayed to Saint Francis and promised that her son would spend a year in a Franciscan friary if he were healed. Francis recovered, which she believed meant that God had granted her prayer. At 13 years of age Francis fulfilled that votive year. After this year he dedicated himself to a life of solitude and penance as a hermit.

In 1435, two followers joined Francis and began the community, which was first called the "Poor Hermits of St. Francis of Assisi." Francis and his followers founded hermitages at Paterno in 1444 and Milazzo, Sicily, in 1469. The Archbishop of Cosenza approved the group and established them as a religious order on November 30, 1470, and this approval was confirmed by Pope Sixtus IV in his bull Sedes Apostolica of May 17, 1474. At that time, the pope also changed their status from that of hermits to mendicant friars.

The name Minims comes from the Italian word minimo, meaning the smallest or the least, and their founder would call himself il minimo dei minimi. Francis of Paola wanted to distinguish himself as being of even less significance than the Friars Minor founded by his patron saint. Francis composed a rule for the community in 1493, which was approved under the name of "Hermits of the Order of the Minims". The definitive version of the rule was solemnly approved by Pope Julius II in the Bull Inter ceteros, July 28, 1506, who also simplified the name of the community to the Order of Minims.

In addition to the standard three religious vows of chastity, poverty and obedience, the rule contains the vow of "a Lenten way of life", which is considered to be the distinctive feature of the Minims. This vow is for perpetual abstinence from all meat, eggs and dairy products, except in case of grave illness and by order of a physician. The order is also discalced.

The Minim habit consists of a black wool tunic, with broad sleeves, a hood, and a short scapular. It has a thick, black cord (with four knots that signify the four vows) with a tassel to gird the robe.

The Order of the Minims spread throughout Italy in the fifteenth century and was introduced to France in 1482, and later to Spain and to Germany in 1497. The houses in Spain, Germany, and France were suppressed during the period following the French Revolution. By the turn of the 20th century, only 19 friaries remained, all but one of them in Italy. On December 31, 2010, the order had 46 communities with 174 members, 112 of them priests. The majority of these were in Italy, but they are also established in Brazil, Cameroon, Colombia, the Democratic Republic of the Congo, the Czech Republic, India, Mexico, Spain, and the United States of America.

Paulaner brewery
The Munich friary of the German Minims brewed beer as means of support, but after the friars were expelled, the brewery continued independently. It continues to brew the Paulaner brand of beer, which draws its name from Francis of Paola.

Notable Minim friars

 Gaspar de Bono (1530–1604)
Marin Mersenne (1588–1648)
Emmanuel Maignan (1601–1676)
Jean François Niceron (1613–1646)
Nicholas Barré (1621–1686)
Charles Plumier (1646–1704)
Nicholas of Longobardi (1650–1709) canonized in 2014
Fra Galgario (1655–1743)
Louis Feuillée (1660–1732)

Notable Minim tertiaries
Francis de Sales (1567–1622)
Vincent de Paul (1581–1660)

The nuns
Francis was called to France in 1483 by King Louis XI to serve as his deathbed confessor. While he was there, the Spanish ambassador, Don Pedro de Lucena, who was a very pious man, grew to know and admire him. He sent reports of the holy friar to his family back in Jaén. His daughter, Elena, and her two daughters, Maria and Francisca, felt so inspired by Don Pedro's reports, they wanted to dedicate themselves to the way of life Francis had established. Through the ambassador, they communicated their interest to the saint, and asked for a rule of life which they might follow. Francis welcomed their request heartily, and, to this end, he adapted the rule of the friars for them to live as cloistered nuns.

Don Pedro donated a portion of his estate to the young women, and there they formed a small monastic community. They received the Minim religious habit from a Friar Lionet on June 11, 1495, and established the Monastery of Jesus and Mary. This was first and remains the oldest monastery of the Minim nuns. Francisca was elected as the first corrector (religious superior) of the community. She spent many years as the corrector of the monastery, gaining a reputation for holiness, and is today honored as Blessed Francisca. Their proper rule was approved by the Holy See in 1506, at the same time as that of the friars.

The Federation of Minim Nuns of Saint Francis of Paola includes 14 monasteries in Spain, Italy, Mexico, and the Philippines.

Notable Minim nuns
A new community was established in Barcelona on Easter 1623. In 1936, the 25 members of the community in Barcelona were arrested by soldiers of the Republic of Spain. Charged with treason, nine choir nuns and an extern Sister were executed on July 23. They were beatified by Pope Francis on October 13, 2013, and are commemorated on July 23.
Josefa Pilar García Solanas (María Montserrat)
Ramona Ors Torrents (Margarida d'Alacoque of Saint Raymond)
Dolors Vilaseca Gallego (Maria de l'Assumpciò)
Mercè Mestre Trinché (Maria Mercè)
Vicenta Jordá Martí (María de Jesús)
Josepa Panyella Doménech (Josepa of the Heart of Mary)
Teresa Ríus Casas (Trinitat)
Maria Montserrat Ors Molist (Enriqueta)
Ana Ballesta Gelmá (Filomena of Saint Francis de Paola)
Lucrecia García Solanas
  
The Minim Daughters of Mary Immaculate is a separate institute founded in 1867 in Guanajuanto, Mexico, by Pablo de Anda Padilla. The sisters work in schools and medical centers in Mexico, Cuba, Ecuador, Rome, and Nogales, Arizona.

References

External links
 Order of Minims (Nuns branch)
 The Order of Minim Friars
 Message of Pope John Paul II to the Third Order of Minims, 1 May 2001

Italian
 Ordine dei Minimi di s. Francesco di Paola

 
 
1435 establishments in Europe
Christian religious orders established in the 15th century
History of Catholic religious orders
Mendicant orders
Roman Catholic friars